Veturilo is a public bicycle sharing system in Warsaw, Poland, launched on 1 August 2012 with 55 stations and 1000 bicycles in 3 districts - Śródmieście (city centre), Bielany and Ursynów, 2 other stations started operating in the middle of August in Wilanów. It is the biggest public bicycle sharing system in Poland  and the fifth largest in Europe. It is also considered one of the most successful bike sharing systems in the world.

Name
The name Veturilo was chosen in an internet contest. It is an Esperanto word meaning vehicle.  Internet users submitted nearly a thousand proposals, and a jury chose a short-list of six. In the next step, during an internet vote, users chose the name Veturilo (with 32% of votes); other proposals were: Wawabike (26%),  Ziuuu (12%), Rowerynka (12%), Bajker (11%) and Wabik (6%).

System
Bicycles are available for 9 months of the year, from 1 March to 30 November. In order to use the system, users need to register and pay a 10 zł initial fee. The first 20 minutes of the ride are free of charge, longer rides cost at least 1 zł. A bicycle can be used for up to 12 hours, there is a 200 zł fee for exceeding this limit, and after 13 hours the operator can report the bicycle as stolen to the police. The fee for the theft, loss or destruction of a bicycle is 2000 zł.

The Veturilo was compatible with Bemowo Bike, a bicycle sharing system in the Bemowo district operating in the years 2012–2014.

See also 
 List of bicycle sharing systems

References

External links

Community bicycle programs
Cycling in Poland
Public transport in Poland
Transport in Warsaw
Bicycle sharing in Poland